Hainuke Temple, known as "Hainukedugang" (海努克都纲, meaning "Yak Temple") in Mongolian and "Yinding Temple" (银顶寺) in Chinese, was a temple of Gelug from the time of the Dzungar Khanate.

Hainuke Temple was destroyed and its ruins are located in Qapqal Xibe Autonomous County, Ili Kazakh Autonomous Prefecture, Xinjiang Uygur Autonomous Region.

History

Construction
In the seventies of the 17th century, the Olot Mongolian Junggar Tribe (厄鲁特蒙古准噶尔部) moved its capital to Ili, and the Hainuke Ancient City (海努克古城) became the capital of the Dzungar Khanate. At the beginning of the 18th century, they built the Hainuke Temple on the south bank of the Yili River.

Destroyed
In December 1753, Hainuke Temple was burned down. Later, the temple was rebuilt. In 1762, the Qing Government wanted to set up a military castle in Hainuke Temple, and the Temple was demolished.

Hainuke Temple Relic Site
Hainuke Temple Relic Site (海努克庙遗址) is located in Qapqal Xibe Autonomous County, and was designated as a protected cultural relic in the Xinjiang Autonomous Region in 1966.

References

18th-century establishments in China
18th-century Buddhist temples
Buddhist temples in Xinjiang
Buddhist temples in China
Tibetan Buddhist temples
Tibetan Buddhist temples in China
Gelug monasteries and temples
Buildings and structures demolished in 1762
Demolished buildings and structures in China